Sphenoparme is a monospecific genus of velvet worm containing the single species Sphenoparme hobwensis. This species has 15 pairs of legs in both sexes. The type locality of this species is Lamington National Park, Queensland, Australia.

References

Further reading 
 

Onychophorans of Australasia
Onychophoran genera
Monotypic protostome genera
Fauna of Queensland
Endemic fauna of Australia
Taxa named by Amanda Reid (malacologist)